Chémery is a commune in the Loir-et-Cher department in central France.

Population

See also
Chémery-Chéhéry, Ardennes, France, part of which is Chémery-sur-Bar
Chémery-les-Deux, Moselle, France
Chémery-lès-Faulquemont, Moselle, France
Communes of the Loir-et-Cher department

References

Communes of Loir-et-Cher